The following is a list of notable deaths in August 2010.

Entries for each day are listed alphabetically by surname. A typical entry lists information in the following sequence:
 Name, age, country of citizenship at birth, subsequent country of citizenship (if applicable), reason for notability, cause of death (if known), and reference.

August 2010

1
Robert F. Boyle, 100, American art director and production designer (North By Northwest, The Birds, Fiddler on the Roof).
Bruce Garvey, 70, British-born Canadian journalist, lung cancer.
Lolita Lebrón, 90, Puerto Rican nationalist.
William MacVane, 95, American surgeon and politician, mayor of Portland, Maine (1971).
Stig Mårtensson, 87, Swedish Olympic cyclist.
K. M. Mathew, 93, Indian newspaper editor (Malayala Manorama).
Eric Tindill, 99, New Zealand cricketer and rugby union player.

2
Ian Castles, 75, Australian public servant, Australian Statistician (1986–1994).
James Hunter, 56, American football player (Detroit Lions), apparent heart attack.
Mitch Jayne, 82, American bluegrass bassist (The Dillards) and actor (The Andy Griffith Show), cancer.
Ole Ivar Lovaas, 83, Norwegian psychologist and researcher (Lovaas technique), Alzheimer's disease.
José María Silvero, 78, Argentine footballer.
Artemio Villanueva, 64, Paraguayan footballer 
Jan Wilson, 66, British politician, Leader of Sheffield City Council (1997–1999, 2002–2008), lung cancer.
Rumen Yordanov, 51, Bulgarian Olympic wrestler.

3
Kathleen Gemberling Adkison, 93, American abstract painter.
Marilyn Buck, 62, American activist and terrorist, uterine cancer.
Bruce M. Cohen, 65, American rabbi, cancer.
James L. Gray, 84, British engineer.
Bobby Hebb, 72, American singer-songwriter ("Sunny"), lung cancer.
Antonio Subirana, 78, Spanish Olympic water polo player.
Norman Walsh, 77, Zimbabwean air marshal.
Edmund Zientara, 81, Polish Olympic footballer.

4
Manuel Ayau, 84, Guatemalan businessman.
Robert E. Davis, 70, American jurist, Chief Justice of the Kansas Supreme Court (2009–2010).
Gary Johnson, 57, American football player (San Diego Chargers), stroke.
Jim Kennan, 64, Australian lawyer and politician, Deputy Premier of Victoria (1990–1992), cancer.
Henry A. Lardy, 92, American biochemist.
Daikirin Takayoshi, 68, Japanese sumo wrestler, pancreatic cancer.

5
Robert Baker Aitken, 93, American Zen Buddhist teacher, pneumonia.
Godfrey Binaisa, 90, Ugandan politician, President (1979–1981).
Francisco María González, 92, Mexican Roman Catholic prelate.
Sue Napier, 62, Australian politician, Leader of the Tasmanian Opposition (1999–2001), breast cancer.
Jürgen Oesten, 96, German seaman, U-boat commander during World War II.
Yuri Shishlov, 65, Russian football coach, shot.

6
Ultus Álvarez, 78, Cuban baseball player.
Cacilda Borges Barbosa, 96, Brazilian electronic musician.
Julian Besag, 65, British statistician.
Catfish Collins, 66, American guitarist (James Brown, Bootsy's Rubber Band, Parliament-Funkadelic), cancer.
David C. Dolby, 64, American soldier, Medal of Honor recipient.
Fredrik Ericsson, 35, Swedish mountaineer, falling accident on K2.
Constantin Guirma, 90, Burkinabé Catholic prelate, bishop of Kaya (1969–1996).
Tony Judt, 62, British historian, amyotrophic lateral sclerosis.
John Louis Mansi, 83, British actor, lung cancer.
Jeff McLean, 62, Australian rugby football player, cancer.
Knut Østby, 87, Norwegian sprint canoer, Olympic silver medalist (1948).
Jack Phipps, 84, British arts administrator.

7
Roberto Cantoral, 75, Mexican composer, heart attack.
Bruno Cremer, 80, French actor (Is Paris Burning?, Sorcerer, Maigret).
Keith Drumright, 55, American baseball player (Houston Astros, Oakland Athletics).
Jerry Flint, 79, American automotive journalist (Forbes), stroke.
Leonid Gorbenko, 71, Russian politician, governor of Kaliningrad Oblast (1996–2000).
Alex Johns, 43, American film producer (The Ant Bully) and television producer (Futurama), after long illness.
John Nelder, 85, British statistician, President of the Royal Statistical Society (1985–1986).
Werner Winter, 86, German linguist.

8
Sikandar Alam, 71, Indian singer.
Aleksandr Bokovikov, 53, Russian politician, governor of Evenk Autonomous Okrug (1997–2001), heart attack.
Ken Boyes, 75, English footballer (York City F.C.).
Charlie Davao, 75, Filipino actor, colorectal cancer.
David Dixon, 87, American businessman, founder of the United States Football League.
Alan Myers, 77, British translator.
Patricia Neal, 84, American actress, (Hud, Breakfast at Tiffany's, The Day the Earth Stood Still), Oscar winner (1964), lung cancer.
Jack Parnell, 87, British musician and bandleader (The Muppet Show), cancer.
Bernhard Philberth, 83, German physicist, engineer, philosopher and theologian.
Matthew Simmons, 67, American businessman and economist.
Massamasso Tchangai, 32, Togolese footballer, after brief illness.

9
Tab Baker, 49, American actor (Save the Last Dance, The Ice Harvest, Prison Break), heart attack.
Lech Boguszewicz, 71, Polish Olympic athlete.
George DiCenzo, 70, American character actor (Close Encounters of the Third Kind, Helter Skelter) and voice actor (She-Ra: Princess of Power), sepsis.
Fernando Fernández, 70, Spanish illustrator and comic artist, after long illness.
Robin Warwick Gibson, 66, British art historian.
Gene Hermanski, 90, American baseball player (Brooklyn Dodgers).
Calvin "Fuzz" Jones, 84, American blues bassist and singer.
James C. Keck, 86, American physicist ane engineer.
Herbert Kirschner, 85, German Olympic sprint canoer.
Jay Larkin, 59, American television boxing executive (Showtime), brain tumor.
Harry Lindbäck, 83, Swedish Olympic sprint canoer.
Paul K. Longmore, 64, American historian and disability activist.
Mariam Baharum, 75, Singaporean actress, natural causes.
Juan Marichal, 88, Spanish historian.
Paul Milstein, 88, American real estate developer.
Roy Pinney, 98, American herpetologist, photographer, war correspondent and writer.
Ronald Reid-Daly, 83, South African army officer (Rhodesian Army), founder and commander of the Selous Scouts.
Ted Stevens, 86, American politician, Senator from Alaska (1968–2009), inventor of the term series of tubes, victim of 2010 Alaska plane crash.
Mary Anne Warren, 63, American philosopher and academic.
John Yaremko, 91, Canadian politician, MPP for Bellwoods (1951–1975).

10
Ron Allen, 62, American poet and playwright.
Gordon Robertson Cameron, 88, Canadian politician, Commissioner of Yukon (1962–1966).
Brian Clark, 67, English footballer (Cardiff City F.C.), after long illness.
Dana Dawson, 36, American actress and singer, colorectal cancer.
Séamus Dolan, 95, Irish politician, Teachta Dála (1961–1965) and Senator (1965–1969, 1973–1982).
Marie de Garis, 100, Guernseyan author.
Slavko Koletić, 60, Croatian Olympic wrestler.
Antonio Pettigrew, 42, American athletics coach, 1991 world champion and 2000 Olympic sprinter, suicide by overdose of medication.
Leo Pinto, 96, Indian field hockey player, Olympic gold medalist (1948).
Thelma Pressman, 89, American microwave cooking consultant, opened first microwave cooking school in the United States.
Jimmy Reid, 78, Scottish trade unionist and journalist.
Armando Robles Godoy, 87, Peruvian film director, heart failure.
Radomír Šimůnek, Sr., 48, Czech racing cyclist, liver cirrhosis.
Adam Stansfield, 31, English footballer (Exeter City F.C.), colorectal cancer.
Shirley Thomson, 80, Canadian arts administrator, heart attack.
David L. Wolper, 82, American film and television producer (North and South, Roots, The Thorn Birds), heart failure and Parkinson's disease.

11
Gretel Beer, 89, Austrian-born British cookery and travel writer.
David Hull, 75, American philosopher, pancreatic cancer.
*Sir Geoffrey Johnson-Smith, 86, British politician, MP for Holborn and St Pancras South (1959–1964), East Grinstead (1965–1983) and Wealden (1983–2001).
Nellie King, 82, American baseball player and public address announcer (Pittsburgh Pirates).
Ger Lagendijk, 68, Dutch footballer (Hermes DVS) and football agent, heart attack.
Markus Liebherr, 62, Swiss businessman, owner of Southampton F.C.
Kanapathy Moorthy, 77, Malaysian judoka.
Dan Rostenkowski, 82, American politician, Representative from Illinois (1959–1995), lung cancer.
Bruno Schleinstein, 78, German actor.
Sesenne, 96, Saint Lucian singer.
Lou Smit, 75, American police detective, investigated JonBenét Ramsey case, colorectal cancer.
James Mourilyan Tanner, 90, British paediatrician.
Sir Ron Trotter, 82, New Zealand businessman, cancer.
Arnold Zellner, 83, American econometrician and statistician, cancer.

12
Len Andrews, 87, Australian footballer.
Isaac Bonewits, 60, American Neopagan leader and author, colorectal cancer.
Guido de Marco, 79, Maltese politician, President (1999–2004), President of the United Nations General Assembly (1990).
Laurence Gardner, 67, British writer and academic, lecturer on historical revisionism, after long illness.
Richie Hayward, 64, American drummer (Little Feat), liver cancer.
Manfred Homberg, 77, German Olympic boxer.
André Kim, 74, South Korean fashion designer, pneumonia.
Victor Kremer, 78, Luxembourgian Olympic shooter.
Mario Laguë, 52, Canadian diplomat, Liberal Party communications director, road accident.
Artur Olech, 70, Polish boxer, Olympic silver medalist (1964, 1968).
Andrew Roth, 91, American-born British biographer and journalist, prostate cancer.
Paul Ryan Rudd, 70, American actor (Beacon Hill, The Betsy), pancreatic cancer.
Mohammad Ali Taraghijah, 67, Iranian painter.
Luis Tascón, 41, Venezuelan politician, member of the National Assembly, colorectal cancer.

13
Colin François Lloyd Austin, 69, British scholar.
Panagiotis Bachramis, 34, Greek footballer (Veria F.C.), fishing accident.
Helen Berg, 78, American statistician and politician, mayor of Corvallis, Oregon (1994–2006), peritoneal mesothelioma.
Lance Cade, 29, American professional wrestler, (WWE, NWA, AJPW, HUSTLE) heart failure.
Patrick Cauvin, 77, French novelist, complications from cancer.
Jacques Faivre, 76, French Roman Catholic prelate, Bishop of Le Mans (1997–2008), heart attack.
Alejandro Febrero, 85, Spanish swimmer.
Albert Frost, 96, British businessman.
Steve Jordan, 71, American accordionist, complications from liver cancer.
Edward Kean, 85, American television writer (Howdy Doody), complications from emphysema.
Alberto Müller Rojas, 75, Venezuelan military officer and politician, adviser to Hugo Chávez.
Edwin Newman, 91, American journalist and newscaster (NBC News), pneumonia.
Isaac Passy, 82, Bulgarian philosopher and art historian.
Phil Petillo, 64, American luthier and engineer.
Jan Reinås, 66, Norwegian businessman, cancer.
David Rowland, 86, American industrial designer.
Craig Van Tilbury, 53, American guitarist and chess master, heart attack.
Janaki Venkataraman, 89, Indian First Lady (1987–1992), after short illness.

14
Mervyn Alexander, 85, British Roman Catholic prelate, Bishop of Clifton (1974–2001).
Rallis Kopsidis, 81, Greek painter.
Herman Leonard, 87, American jazz photographer.
Abbey Lincoln, 80, American jazz singer and actress (For Love of Ivy, Nothing But a Man).
Lynn Lowe, 74, American politician, Chairman of the Arkansas Republican Party (1974–1980).
Terje Stigen, 88, Norwegian author.
Sherman W. Tribbitt, 87, American politician, Governor of Delaware (1973–1977).
Gloria Winters, 78, American actress (The Life of Riley, Sky King), complications from pneumonia.

15
Ahmad Alaadeen, 76, American jazz musician, bladder cancer.
Ghazi Abdul Rahman Al Gosaibi, 70, Saudi Minister of Labour, after long illness.
Dan Avey, 69, American radio personality, cancer.
Joe L. Brown, 91, American baseball executive (Pittsburgh Pirates), after long illness.
Denis E. Dillon, 76, American lawyer and politician, District Attorney of Nassau County, New York (1974–2005), lymphoma.
James J. Kilpatrick, 89, American columnist and grammarian.
Philip Markoff, 24, American murder suspect, suicide.
Harrison Price, 89, American businessman, theme park pioneer.
Alexander Prosvirnin, 46, Ukrainian Olympic Nordic combined skier.
Lionel Régal, 35, French hillclimbing racer, car accident.

16
John Amyas Alexander, 88, British archaeologist.
Sten Christer Andersson, 67, Swedish politician.
Nicola Cabibbo, 75, Italian physicist, President of the Pontifical Academy of Sciences, respiratory problems.
Christopher Freeman, 88, British economist.
Dimitrios Ioannidis, 87, Greek army officer, junta leader.
Meir Jacob Kister, 96, Israeli Arabist.
Frank Ryan, 50, American plastic surgeon, car crash.
Narayan Gangaram Surve, 83, Indian poet, after short illness.
Bobby Thomson, 86, Scottish-born American baseball player (Shot Heard 'Round the World), after long illness.

17
Francesco Cossiga, 82, Italian politician, Prime Minister (1979–1980) and President (1985–1992), respiratory problems.
Frank C. Garland, 60, American epidemiologist, esophageal cancer.
C. Joseph Genster, 92, American marketer (Metrecal), natural causes.
Don Graham, 96, American real estate developer (Ala Moana Center), pneumonia.
Franc Gubenšek, 72, Slovene biochemist, Alzheimer's disease.
Amin al-Hindi, 70, Palestinian intelligence chief of the National Authority, pancreatic cancer.
Sir Frank Kermode, 90, British literary critic and writer.
Ludvík Kundera, 90, Czech writer and translator, recipient of the Jaroslav Seifert Prize.
Alejandro Maclean, 41, Spanish television, film producer and aerobatics pilot, plane crash.
François Marcantoni, 90, French gangster.
Eugene McDonnell, 83, American computer scientist.
Bill Millin, 88, British soldier, bagpiper during World War II.
Edwin Morgan, 90, Scottish poet, The Scots Makar, pneumonia.
Ricardo José Weberberger, 70, Austrian-born Brazilian Roman Catholic prelate, bishop of Barreiras (1979–2010).

18
William Breuer, 87, American military historian.
Carlos Hugo, Duke of Parma, 80, Spanish aristocrat, Carlist pretender to the Throne, cancer.
Edelmiro Cavazos Leal, 38, Mexican politician, mayor of Santiago, shot. (body found on this date)
Hal Connolly, 79, American hammer thrower, Olympic gold medalist (1956), brain trauma.
Fiona Coyne, 45, South African television presenter (The Weakest Link), suspected suicide.
Martin Dannenberg, 94, American World War II soldier, located the Nuremberg Laws, natural causes.
Sepp Daxenberger, 48, German politician, bone marrow cancer.
Steve DeLong, 67, American football player (San Diego Chargers).
Kenny Edwards, 64, American singer-songwriter (The Stone Poneys), prostate cancer.
Rina Franchetti, 102, Italian actress.
Robert Gundlach, 84, American physicist and inventor.
Benjamin Kaplan, 99, American jurist, Associate Justice of the Massachusetts Supreme Judicial Court (1972–1981), pneumonia.
Ryszard Kosiński, 55, Polish Olympic sprint canoer.
Christopher Kovacevich, 82, American Orthodox prelate, Metropolitan of Libertyville and Chicago, cancer.
Mario G. Obledo, 78, American politician and activist, co-founder of MALDEF, heart attack.
Rodolfo Salas, 82, Peruvian Olympic basketball player.
Efraim Sevela, 82, Russian writer and screenwriter.
Rod Shealy, 56, American political consultant, cerebral hemorrhage.
Subair, 48, Indian actor, heart attack.
Héctor Velásquez, 58, Chilean Olympic boxer, stroke.
William Wilson, 97, British solicitor and politician (MP for Coventry South 1964–1974, Coventry South East 1974–1983).

19
Skandor Akbar, 75, American professional wrestler and wrestling manager.
Mitsuo Aoki, 95, American theologian.
Michael Been, 60, American musician (The Call) and actor (The Last Temptation of Christ), heart attack.
Gerhard Beil, 84, East German politician.
Zenon Bortkevich, 73, Azerbaijani Olympic bronze medal-winning (1964) water polo player.
Ahna Capri, 66, American actress (Enter the Dragon), car accident.
Jackson Gillis, 93, American television writer (Columbo, Perry Mason), pneumonia.
Suzanne Grossmann, 72, American actress and television writer, chronic obstructive pulmonary disease.
David D. Kpormakpor, 74, Liberian politician, Chairman of the Interim Council of State (1994–1995).
Dick Maloney, 77, Canadian singer.
Joe Matthews, 81, activist and politician. (born 1929)
Anker Sørensen, 84, Danish film editor and director.

20
Pramarn Adireksarn, 96, Thai military officer and politician, blood infection.
Johnny Bailey, 43, American football player (Chicago Bears, Arizona Cardinals), pancreatic cancer.
Carys Bannister, 74–75, British neurosurgeon.
James Dooge, 88, Irish politician and academic, Senator (1961–1977; 1981–1987), Minister for Foreign Affairs (1981–1982).
Samuel Gaumain, 95, French Roman Catholic prelate, Bishop of Moundou (1960–1974).
Gyda Hansen, 72, Danish actress, cancer.
Jack Horkheimer, 72, American public television host (Jack Horkheimer: Star Gazer), executive director of Miami Planetarium, respiratory ailment.
Samuel Lehtonen, 89, Finnish Lutheran prelate, bishop of Helsinki.
Tiberio Murgia, 81, Italian actor.
Conny Mus, 59, Dutch journalist, cardiac arrest.
Charles S. Roberts, 80, American game designer and railroad historian.
Franz Schurmann, 84, American founder of Pacific News Service, Cold War expert on China, Alzheimer's disease and Parkinson's disease.
Howard Boyd Turrentine, 96, American senior (former chief) judge of the District Court for the Southern District of California.
David J. Weber, 69, American historian and author on the American Southwest, multiple myeloma.

21
Alberto Ablondi, 85, Italian Roman Catholic prelate, bishop of Livorno (1970–2000).
Magomedali Vagabov, 35, terrorist, leader of the Vilayat Dagestan, Supreme Quadi of the Caucasus Emirate, killed by Russian troops.
Gheorghe Apostol, 97, Romanian politician, General Secretary of the Romanian Communist Party (1954–1955).
Calvin Blignault, 30, South African mechanical engineer, traffic collision.
Satch Davidson, 75, American baseball umpire (National League).
Nancy Dolman, 58, Canadian actress (Soap), wife of Martin Short, natural causes.
Harold Dow, 62, American television news correspondent (48 Hours), asthma.
Rodolfo Enrique Fogwill, 69, Argentine writer, lung cancer.
Melody Gersbach, 24, Filipina beauty queen, Binibining Pilipinas International (2009), car crash.
Chloé Graftiaux, 23, Belgian rock climber, mountaineering accident.
*Hugo Guerrero Marthineitz, 86, Peruvian journalist, commentator and radio host, cardiac arrest.
Sir Peter Gwynn-Jones, 70, British herald, Garter Principal King of Arms (1995–2010).
Masaru Nashimoto, 65, Japanese reporter, lung cancer.
Christoph Schlingensief, 49, German film and theatre director, lung cancer.
Lakhdar Ben Tobbal, Algerian politician.

22
A. K. Veerasami, 84, Indian film actor.
Raúl Belén, 79, Argentine footballer.
Stjepan Bobek, 86, Yugoslavian footballer (1950 and 1954 FIFA World Cups, 1948 and 1952 Olympic silver medalist).
Gheorghe Fiat, 81, Romanian Olympic bronze medal-winning (1952) boxer.
Raymond Hawkey, 80, British graphic designer.
Robert S. Ingersoll, 96, American politician, Assistant Secretary of State for East Asian and Pacific Affairs (1974), Deputy Secretary of State (1974–1976).
Bengt Lindroos, 91, Swedish architect (Kaknästornet).
Sir Donald Maitland, 88, British diplomat.
Michel Montignac, 66, French nutritionist, creator of Montignac diet.
Conny Stuart, 96, Dutch singer and actress.

23
Marcel Albert, 92, French aviator, World War II flying ace.
Tito Burns, 89, British musician, prostate cancer.
Kihachirō Kawamoto, 85, Japanese puppet designer and animator.
Dave McElhatton, 81, American television news anchor, complications of a stroke.
Carlos Mendo, 77, Spanish journalist, founder of El País newspaper, after long illness.
Natalie Nevins, 85, American singer (The Lawrence Welk Show), complications from hip surgery.
Bill Phillips, 74, American country music singer.
George T. Smith, 93, American politician and jurist, Lieutenant Governor of Georgia (1967–1971), Supreme Court of Georgia (1981–1991).
George David Weiss, 89, American composer ("What a Wonderful World", "Can't Help Falling in Love", "The Lion Sleeps Tonight"), natural causes.
Gareth Williams, 31, British intelligence officer (GCHQ seconded to MI6). (body discovered on this date)

24
Douglas K. Amdahl, 91, American jurist, Chief Justice of the Minnesota Supreme Court (1981–1989).
Barkhad Awale Adan, 59-60, Somali journalist, shot.
Maixent Coly, 60, Senegalese Roman Catholic prelate, bishop of Ziguinchor (since 1995).
Idiris Muse Elmi, Somali politician, member of the Transitional Federal Parliament, victim of Muna Hotel attack.
Geddi Abdi Gadid, Somali politician, member of the Transitional Federal Parliament, victim of Muna Hotel attack.
Pierre Marie Gallois, 99, French brigadier general and geopolitician.
Satoshi Kon, 46, Japanese film director (Perfect Blue, Tokyo Godfathers, Paprika), pancreatic cancer.
Sir Graham Liggins, 84, New Zealand scientist, after long illness.
Ian McDougall, 65, Canadian television producer, sudden heart failure.
Bulle Hassan Mo'allim, Somali politician, member of the Transitional Federal Parliament, victim of Muna Hotel attack.
Scotty Moylan, 94, Guamanian businessman and entrepreneur.
Vladimir Msryan, 72, Armenian actor.
Mohamed Hassan M. Nur, Somali politician, member of the Transitional Federal Parliament, victim of Muna Hotel attack.
Acácio Rodrigues Alves, 85, Brazilian Roman Catholic prelate, bishop of Palmares (1962–2000).
William B. Saxbe, 94, American politician, Senator from Ohio (1969–1974) and Attorney General (1974–1975), pancreatic cancer.
Mitsuyo Seo, 98, Japanese animator.
Gibson Sibanda, 66, Zimbabwean politician, cancer.

25
Daniel P. Davison, 85, American banker and chairman (J.P. Morgan, Christie's, Metropolitan Museum, Burlington Northern), pancreatic cancer.
Esther Earl, 16, American activist and vlogger, thyroid cancer.
Andrew S. C. Ehrenberg, 84, British marketing scientist.
Norm McAtee, 89, Canadian ice hockey player.
Howard McDiarmid, 83, Canadian physician and politician, cancer.
Clive Mitchell, 91, Australian politician, member of the Victorian Legislative Council (1968–1973).
*Jaime Prieto Amaya, 69, Colombian Roman Catholic prelate, bishop of Barrancabermeja (1993–2008) and Cúcuta (since 2008).

26
Frank Baumgartl, 55, German Olympic bronze medal-winning (1976) steeplechaser, heart failure.
John Karefa-Smart, 95, Sierra Leonean politician, Foreign Minister (1961–1964).
Steve Laore, 46, Solomon Islands politician.
William B. Lenoir, 71, American NASA astronaut, head injury.
Bob Maitland, 86, British Olympic silver medal-winning (1948) cyclist, heart attack.
Cal McLish, 84, American baseball player.
Raimon Panikkar, 91, Spanish theologian.
Jack Pitney, 47, American marketing executive (BMW North America), promoter of the Mini Cooper, tractor accident.
Rustum Roy, 86, Indian physicist.
Charlotte Tansey, 88, Canadian educator.
Walter Wolfrum, 87, German World War II Luftwaffe fighter ace.

27
Juan Acevedo Pavez, 95, Chilean politician.
Tony Borne, 84, American professional wrestler.
John Calhoun, 85, American Olympic diver.
Fermo Camellini, 95, Italian-born French road bicycle racer.
Corinne Day, 48, British photographer (Vogue), brain tumour.
Anton Geesink, 76, Dutch judoka, 1964 Olympic gold medalist and member of the IOC.
Bernard Goldberg, 84, American businessman, co-founder of Raymour & Flanigan, Alzheimer's disease.
Hanna Grages, 87, German Olympic gymnast.
George Hitchcock, 96, American poet and publisher.
Ivan Ivanov, 73, Bulgarian Olympic wrestler.
Marampudi Joji, 67, Indian Roman Catholic prelate, archbishop of Hyderabad (since 2000), cardiac arrest.
Ravindra Kelekar, 85, Indian author, poet and activist, after short illness.
Andrew McIntosh, Baron McIntosh of Haringey, 77, British politician and life peer, Greater London Council member (1973–1983), Captain of the Yeomen of the Guard (1997–2003).
Oscar Ntwagae, 33, South African footballer, hit by automobile.
Simone Scatizzi, 79, Italian Roman Catholic prelate, bishop of Fiesole (1977–1981) and Pistoia (1981–2006).
Colin Tennant, 3rd Baron Glenconner, 83, Scottish noble, developer of Mustique.
Luna Vachon, 48, Canadian professional wrestler, drug overdose.
Sigurd Verdal, 83, Norwegian politician.
Thomas White, Jr., 71, American politician, member of the New York City Council (1992–2001, since 2006).

28
Mohammad Hassan Ahmadi Faqih, 58-59, Iranian grand ayatollah.
Keith Batey, 91, British codebreaker during World War II.
Pietro Chiodini, 76, Italian cyclist.
Daniel Ducarme, 56, Belgian politician, Minister-President of the Brussels Capital-Region (2003–2004), cancer.
William P. Foster, 91, American marching band director (Florida A&M University).
John Freeborn, 90, British fighter pilot and flying ace during World War II, age-related complications.
Sinan Hasani, 88, Kosovar writer and politician, President of Yugoslavia (1986–1987).
 Isa Bakar, 58, Malaysian footballer.
Augoustinos Kantiotes, 103, Greek Orthodox Metropolitan of Florina (1967–2000), renal failure.
Robin Loh, 81, Singaporean businessman, founder of Robina, Queensland, breathing difficulties.
Sir Richard Peek, 96, British admiral.
Bill Strum, 72, American world champion curler.

29
A. C. Baantjer, 86, Dutch author.
Louis Bastide, 67, Malian judge and diplomat, President of the Supreme Court.
Totti Cohen, 78, Australian educational activist.
James Deuter, 71, American actor (Early Edition, Major League).
Ary Fernandes, 79, Brazilian filmmaker, stroke.
Gwen Gaze, 95, Australian-born American actress (I Cover the War).
Lowell Jack, 85, American historian and broadcaster, cancer.
Peter Lenz, 13, American motorcycle racer, racetrack crash.
Victoria Longley, 49, Australian actress, breast cancer.

30
Jairo Aníbal Niño, 68, Colombian writer.
J. C. Bailey, 27, American professional wrestler, brain aneurysm.
Dejene Berhanu, 29, Ethiopian Olympic runner, suicide.
Franklin Brito, 49, Venezuelan agricultural producer and protester, starvation due to hunger strike.
Louis Calebout, 82, Belgian Olympic boxer.
Alain Corneau, 67, French filmmaker, cancer.
Henryk Czapczyk, 88, Polish footballer.
Patrick Dougherty, 78, Australian Roman Catholic prelate, bishop of Bathurst (1983–2008).
Myrtle Edwards, 89, Australian cricketer and softball player.
Owen Edwards, 76, British television executive, Director of BBC Wales (1974–1981).
Lakshman Jayakody, 80, Sri Lankan politician, Minister of Buddhist Affairs (1994–2000), after short illness.
Nicholas Lyell, Baron Lyell of Markyate, 71, British politician, MP (1979–2001), Solicitor General (1987–1992), Attorney General (1992–1997) and life peer, cancer.
Jim MacLaren, 47, American triathlete.
Irvin Rockman, 72, Australian politician and businessman, Lord Mayor of Melbourne (1977–1979), eye cancer.
Mikhail Sado, 76, Russian Assyrian dissident, politician and scholar.
Philip Tisson, 24, Saint Lucian footballer, shot.
Lynn Turner, 42, American murderer, suicide by overdose of prescription medication.
Francisco Varallo, 100, Argentine footballer, last surviving participant in the 1930 FIFA World Cup.

31
Vance Bourjaily, 87, American novelist.
Laurent Fignon, 50, French road bicycle racer, winner of 1983 and 1984 Tour de France, lung cancer.
Jean-Marie Kélétigui, 78, Ivorian Bishop Emeritus of Katiola.
Gail Koff, 65, American lawyer and partner in Jacoby & Meyers, leukemia.
Mick Lally, 64, Irish actor (Glenroe, The Secret of Kells, Alexander), heart failure and emphysema.
Andreas Miaoulis, 72, Greek basketball executive, cancer.
Ken Orsatti, 78, American director of the Screen Actors Guild (1981–2000), pulmonary disease.
Vladimir Raitz, 88, Russian-born British entrepreneur.
Sid Rawle, 64, British campaigner.
John Rowswell, 55, Canadian politician, Mayor of Sault Ste. Marie, Ontario.
Vladimir Shkodrov, 80, Bulgarian astronomer, politician, professor and rector.
Jef Ulburghs, 88, Belgian priest and politician.

References

2010-08
 08